Wonlo Coulibaly (born 22 December 1991) is an Ivorian professional footballer, who plays as a defender, primarily as a left back, for TP Mazembe and the Ivory Coast national team.

Club career
Coulibaly started his career at the age of 16 at Ivorian club Denguélé. He played for the club for 7 years, before moving to AS Tanda in 2015, where he wore the number 4 shirt. After just two seasons in Tanda, his performances earned him a move to Abidjan club ASEC Mimosas, a club who have produced some of the all time greats of football in Ivorian football, such as Yaya and Kolo Touré, Salomon Kalou, Emmanuel Eboué and Gervinho. He wore the number 25 at the club. In 2018-19, he was named as the player of the year for the Ivorian Ligue 1. He spent two years in the capital, before leaving on a free in 2019. He signed for Congolese giants TP Mazembe later that year. Since signing for the club from Lubumbashi, he has made 10 appearances in the CAF Champions League, finding the net once in a 5-2 defeat to Moroccan outfit Wydad.

International career
He made his Ivory Coast national football team debut on 14 January 2018, in a CHAN 2018 game against Namibia.

He was selected for the 2019 Africa Cup of Nations squad. He has been capped 10 times and wears the number 2 shirt for his nation.

Career statistics

International

References

External links
 
 

1991 births
Living people
Ivorian footballers
Association football defenders
AS Denguélé players
AS Tanda players
ASEC Mimosas players
TP Mazembe players
Linafoot players
Ivorian expatriate footballers
Expatriate footballers in the Democratic Republic of the Congo
Ivorian expatriate sportspeople in the Democratic Republic of the Congo
Ivory Coast international footballers
2019 Africa Cup of Nations players
Ivory Coast A' international footballers
2018 African Nations Championship players